Seh Darreh (also known as Seh Darreh’ī) is a village in Rabor Rural District, in the Central District of Rabor County, Kerman Province, Iran. At the 2006 census, its population was 44, in 11 families.

References 

Populated places in Rabor County